The year 2003 is the 11th year in the history of Pancrase, a mixed martial arts promotion based in Japan. In 2003 Pancrase held 14 events beginning with Pancrase: Hybrid 1.

Title fights

Events list

Pancrase: Hybrid 1

Pancrase: Hybrid 1 was an event held on January 26, 2003 at Korakuen Hall in Tokyo, Japan.

Results

Pancrase: Hybrid 2

Pancrase: Hybrid 2 was an event held on February 16, 2003 at the Osaka International Convention Center in Osaka, Osaka, Japan.

Results

Pancrase: Hybrid 3

Pancrase: Hybrid 3 was an event held on March 8, 2003 at the Differ Ariake Arena in Tokyo, Japan.

Results

Pancrase: Hybrid 4

Pancrase: Hybrid 4 was an event held on April 12, 2003 at Korakuen Hall in Tokyo, Japan.

Results

Pancrase: Hybrid 5

Pancrase: Hybrid 5 was an event held on May 18, 2003 at the Yokohama Cultural Gymnasium in Yokohama, Kanagawa, Japan.

Results

Pancrase: Hybrid 6

Pancrase: Hybrid 6 was an event held on June 7, 2003 at Differ Ariake Arena in Tokyo, Japan.

Results

Pancrase: Hybrid 7

Pancrase: Hybrid 7 was an event held on June 22, 2003 at Umeda Stella Hall in Osaka, Osaka, Japan.

Results

Pancrase: 2003 Neo-Blood Tournament Opening Round

Pancrase: 2003 Neo-Blood Tournament Opening Round was an event held on July 27, 2003 at Korakuen Hall in Tokyo, Japan.

Results

Pancrase: 2003 Neo-Blood Tournament Second Round

Pancrase: 2003 Neo-Blood Tournament Second Round was an event held on July 27, 2003 at Korakuen Hall in Tokyo, Japan.

Results

Pancrase: 10th Anniversary Show

Pancrase: 10th Anniversary Show was an event held on August 31, 2003 at Ryogoku Kokugikan in Tokyo, Japan.

Results

Pancrase: Hybrid 8

Pancrase: Hybrid 8 was an event held on October 4, 2003 at Osaka International Convention Center in Osaka, Osaka, Japan.

Results

Pancrase: Hybrid 9

Pancrase: Hybrid 9 was an event held on October 31, 2003 at Korakuen Hall in Tokyo, Japan.

Results

Pancrase: Hybrid 10

Pancrase: Hybrid 10 was an event held on November 30, 2003 at Ryogoku Kokugikan in Tokyo, Japan.

Results

Pancrase: Hybrid 11

Pancrase: Hybrid 11 was an event held on December 21, 2003 at Differ Ariake Arena in Tokyo, Japan.

Results

See also 
 Pancrase
 List of Pancrase champions
 List of Pancrase events

References

Pancrase events
2003 in mixed martial arts